The Dry Lake Wind Power Project in Navajo County is the first and the largest utility-scale wind farm in the U.S. state of Arizona.   Starting in 2009, it was constructed in two phases having a total generating capacity of 128.1 megawatts (MW), and is selling the electricity to the Salt River Power District (SRP).

History 

Around 2003, rancher Bill Elkins began working with developer John Gaglioti and Northern Arizona University scientists to erect measurement towers on his land to measure wind speeds. He studied the local power grid to determine the feasibility of connecting a wind farm. Navajo County and Iberdrola officials credit Gaglioti and Elkins with attracting the first wind farm to Arizona.

Project details 

Phase 1 consists of 30 Suzlon 2.1 MW wind turbines, for a total nameplate capacity of 63 MW. Iberdrola Renewables built the wind farm for $100 million.   Based on wind measurements before construction began, Iberdrola estimated phase 1 would produce an average of 132,450 MWh annually.  Depending on actual performance of phase 1, the company planned to install up to 209 more turbines in future construction phases.

Phase 2 consists of 31 additional Suzlon turbines for a combined nameplate capacity of 65.1 MW.  The location of phase 2 is about seven miles (11 km) northwest of Snowflake and three miles (5 km) southeast of phase 1.

Electricity production 

(*)   partial year of operation

Environmental effect 

According to the USDOE, each 1000 MW of wind power capacity installed in Arizona will save  of water per year and eliminate 2.0 million tons of carbon dioxide emissions. Phase 1 of Dry Lake Wind Power Project would then eliminate:

of carbon dioxide, and save:

of water annually.

See also 

 Wind power in Arizona

References

External links 

 Salt River Project – Dry Lake Wind Power Project
 Video:  Dry Lake Wind Power Project

Energy infrastructure completed in 2009
Buildings and structures in Navajo County, Arizona
Suzlon
Wind farms in Arizona